Andrew Mackay (born 23 July 1946) is an English musician, best known as a founding member (playing oboe and saxophone) of the art rock group Roxy Music.

In addition, he has taught music and provided scores for television, while his CV as a session musician encompasses some of the most noteworthy and recognisable names in the music business.

Life and career
Mackay was born on 23 July 1946 in Lostwithiel, Cornwall, England, and grew up in central London, attending Westminster City School where he was a chorister in the choir of St Margaret's, Westminster. A classically trained woodwind player, he studied music and English literature at the University of Reading. While at university, he played with a band called the Nova Express and, together with future Roxy Music publicist Simon Puxley, formed part of a performance art group called Sunshine. He also struck up a friendship with Winchester art student Brian Eno.

In January 1971, Mackay became a member of the art rock band Roxy Music (formed November 1970) after answering a Melody Maker advertisement placed by singer Bryan Ferry; he soon brought Eno into the group to handle "Synthesiser and Tapes". Prior to signing with E.G. Management, Mackay taught music full-time at Holland Park School and part-time at Bishop Thomas Grant Catholic Comprehensive to support himself. Initially, guitarist David O'List (from the Nice) was part of the group, but he was replaced by Phil Manzanera in February 1972, just as the band's first album was about to be recorded. Drummer Paul Thompson completed the band's line up.

Mackay played oboe and saxophone in Roxy Music, becoming known for his Chuck Berry-inspired duckwalk during saxophone solos, notably on the raucous track "Editions of You". With his pronounced quiff, Star Trek sideburns and outlandish Motown-inspired stage costumes, Mackay made a vital contribution to the unique Roxy Music "look"—much of which functioned as a retro-futurist throwback to 1950s rock and roll performers.

His songwriting credits for Roxy Music include the Top Five hits "Love Is the Drug" (1975) and "Angel Eyes" (1979), plus "A Song for Europe", "Three and Nine", "Bitter-Sweet", "Sentimental Fool", "While My Heart is Still Beating" and "Tara", together with the early experimental B-sides "The Numberer" and "The Pride and the Pain".

He released two instrumental solo studio albums in the 1970s: In Search of Eddie Riff (1974), an exploration of his musical roots, and Resolving Contradictions (1978), based on his impressions of a trip to China.  Both albums featured guest appearances from Paul Thompson and Phil Manzanera of Roxy Music. He also composed and produced the music for the hit television series Rock Follies and Rock Follies of '77, with lyrics by playwright and screenwriter Howard Schuman. Both series sired specially recorded soundtrack albums, the first of which reached number one in the UK Album Chart in March/April 1976. The second contained the single "OK?", which reached number ten in the UK Singles Chart in May/June 1977. Schuman and Mackay reunited in 1983 for the BBC one-off TV drama Video Stars, with Mackay again providing music. He appeared onscreen in cameo roles in both Schuman projects.

Mackay has also worked with Duran Duran, Mott the Hoople, John Cale, Pavlov's Dog, John Mellencamp, Mickey Jupp, Yukihiro Takahashi, Paul McCartney, Godley & Creme, Eddie and the Hot Rods, Tomoyasu Hotei, Arcadia and 801. He played saxophone on several tracks of Brian Eno's Here Come the Warm Jets and Taking Tiger Mountain (By Strategy), both released in 1974.

In 1981, his book Electronic Music: The Instruments, the Music & the Musicians was published by Phaidon.

After Roxy Music's dissolution in 1983, Mackay joined with Roxy guitarist Phil Manzanera to form the Explorers, featuring Bryan Ferry-soundalike James Wraith on lead vocals. The group released a self-titled album in 1985 and three years later resurfaced as Manzanera and Mackay. Under this name, they released a further two albums which combined new material with reissued tracks from the Explorers album.

From 1988 to 1991, Mackay largely abandoned music to take a three-year Bachelor of Divinity course at King's College London. During this time, he played on and produced a Christmas album with the Players, a group of English folk musicians.

He has written several themes for British television and radio, such as the memorable theme music for the late 1970s series Armchair Thriller and Hazell.

With Ferry, Manzanera and Thompson, he took part in the Roxy Music reunion concerts of 2001, with further scattered live dates in 2003, 2005/6, 2011 and 2022 when Roxy Music celebrated their 50th anniversary.

In 2014, he became a founder member of Clive Langer's new band, the Clang Group, playing two dates in London in October 2014 and recording an EP for Domino.

2018 saw the completion of his setting of '3Psalms' which started as an experimental project in the mid 1990s, aiming to be a synthesis of Mackay’s varied influences, from his classical training to his rock and roll, avant-garde electronica and even his years as a boy chorister. Picking up in 2012, Mackay went back into the studio, scoring strings, choir, synthesisers, guitar and some other rock elements. Fellow Roxy musician Phil Manzanera guested on both the album and the London concert premiering the work, which also featured orchestral reworkings of several Roxy Music tracks under the banner 'Roxymphony'.

Discography
Solo studio albums
 In Search of Eddie Riff (1974)
 Resolving Contradictions (1978)
 SAMAS Music for the Senses (2004)
 London! New York! Paris! Rome! (2009)
 3Psalms (2018)

Rock Follies
 Rock Follies (1976)
 Rock Follies of '77 (1977)

Explorers/Manzanera and Mackay
 The Explorers (1985)
 Crack the Whip (1988)
 Up In Smoke (Manzanera and Mackay album)|Up in Smoke (1988)
 The Explorers Live at the Palace (1997)
 The Complete Explorers (2001)

Players
 Christmas (1989)

Andy Mackay + the Metaphors
 London! Paris! New York! Rome! (2009)

References

Bibliography
 Rigby, Jonathan Roxy Music: Both Ends Burning (Reynolds & Hearn, 2005; revised edition 2008)

External links

 
 
 
 :VivaRoxyMusic.com: Comprehensive website on Roxy Music and the solo work including Andy Mackay
 www.themetaphors.com – The official website of Andy Mackay + The Metaphors
 Review of Andy Mackay and The Metaphors, Pigalle Club, London (18/11/08)

1946 births
Living people
English rock saxophonists
British male saxophonists
Alumni of the University of Reading
Alumni of King's College London
Rock oboists
English oboists
Male oboists
Roxy Music members
People from Lostwithiel
Island Records artists
Polydor Records artists
E.G. Records artists
English songwriters
English record producers
Glam rock musicians
801 (band) members
21st-century saxophonists
21st-century British male musicians
British male songwriters
Bronze Records artists